Deacon Edward Convers (January 20, 1590 – August 10, 1663) was an early Puritan settler in the Massachusetts Bay Colony, and was one of the founders of Woburn, MA.

He built the first house and first mill in Woburn.  Convers was very active in town affairs, serving as one of its first selectmen.  He served on "every committee and had a part in every movement that had this new settlement in view."  He also helped establish Charlestown. He was one of the colony's wealthy landowners, and was a farmer, miller and surveyor.

Edward Convers was born January 20, 1590. After his first wife died, he married Sarah Parker in 1614. He and his family arrived in Salem, Massachusetts, with the Winthrop Fleet on June 12, 1630, in the early stages of the Great Migration.

He also founded the First Church of Charlestown, and established the first ferry from Charlestown to Boston.  The ferry operated where the Charles River Bridge is now located, and was referred to as the "Great Ferry" (to distinguish it from a smaller ferry operating between Charlestown and Winnisimmet). Convers died on August 10, 1663, in Woburn, Massachusetts.

References

16th-century births
1663 deaths
American Puritans
American people of English descent
People of colonial Massachusetts
New England Puritanism
American city founders
People from Woburn, Massachusetts
Kingdom of England emigrants to Massachusetts Bay Colony